Brent Szurdoki (born 18 September 1996) is a South African swimmer. He competed in the men's 400 metre freestyle event at the 2017 World Aquatics Championships. In 2019, he represented South Africa at the 2019 African Games held in Rabat, Morocco.

References

1996 births
Living people
South African male swimmers
Place of birth missing (living people)
Swimmers at the 2014 Summer Youth Olympics
African Games silver medalists for South Africa
African Games medalists in swimming
Competitors at the 2019 African Games
South African male freestyle swimmers
Swimmers at the 2015 African Games
Swimmers at the 2019 African Games
20th-century South African people
21st-century South African people